In algebra, a field k is perfect if any one of the following equivalent conditions holds:
 Every irreducible polynomial over k has distinct roots.
 Every irreducible polynomial over k is separable.
 Every finite extension of k is separable.
 Every algebraic extension of k is separable.
 Either k has characteristic 0, or, when k has characteristic , every element of k is a pth power.
 Either k has characteristic 0, or, when k has characteristic , the Frobenius endomorphism  is an automorphism of k.
 The separable closure of k is algebraically closed.
 Every reduced commutative k-algebra A is a separable algebra; i.e.,  is reduced for every field extension F/k. (see below)
Otherwise, k is called imperfect.

In particular, all fields of characteristic zero and all finite fields are perfect.

Perfect fields are significant because Galois theory over these fields becomes simpler, since the general Galois assumption of field extensions being separable is automatically satisfied over these fields (see third condition above).

Another important property of perfect fields is that they admit Witt vectors.

More generally, a ring of characteristic p (p a prime) is called perfect if the Frobenius endomorphism is an automorphism. (When restricted to integral domains, this is equivalent to the above condition "every element of k is a pth power".)

Examples

Examples of perfect fields are: 
 every finite field ;
 every algebraically closed field;
 the union of a set of perfect fields totally ordered by extension;
 fields algebraic over a perfect field.

Most fields that are encountered in practice are perfect. The imperfect case arises mainly in algebraic geometry in characteristic . Every imperfect field is necessarily transcendental over its prime subfield (the minimal subfield), because the latter is perfect. An example of an imperfect field is the field , since the Frobenius sends  and therefore it is not surjective. It embeds into the perfect field

called its perfection. Imperfect fields cause technical difficulties because irreducible polynomials can become reducible in the algebraic closure of the base field. For example, consider  for  an imperfect field of characteristic  and a not a p-th power in f. Then in its algebraic closure , the following equality holds:

where b = a and such b exists in this algebraic closure.

Field extension over a perfect field 
Any finitely generated field extension K over a perfect field k is separably generated, i.e. admits a separating transcendence base, that is, a transcendence base Γ such that K is separably algebraic over k(Γ).

Perfect closure and perfection

The perfect closure can be used in a test for separability. More precisely, a commutative k-algebra A is separable if and only if  is reduced.

In terms of universal properties, the perfect closure of a ring A of characteristic p is a perfect ring Ap of characteristic p together with a ring homomorphism  such that for any other perfect ring B of characteristic p with a homomorphism  there is a unique homomorphism  such that v factors through u (i.e. ). The perfect closure always exists; the proof involves "adjoining p-th roots of elements of A", similar to the case of fields.

The perfection of a ring A of characteristic p is the dual notion (though this term is sometimes used for the perfect closure). In other words, the perfection R(A) of A is a perfect ring of characteristic p together with a map  such that for any perfect ring B of characteristic p equipped with a map , there is a unique map  such that φ factors through θ (i.e. ). The perfection of A may be constructed as follows. Consider the projective system

where the transition maps are the Frobenius endomorphism. The inverse limit of this system is R(A) and consists of sequences (x0, x1, ... ) of elements of A such that  for all i. The map  sends (xi) to x0.

See also 
p-ring
Perfect ring
Quasi-finite field

Notes

References

External links
 

Ring theory
Field (mathematics)